Joshua C. James "Aggie" Agajanian (June 16, 1913May 5, 1984) was an influential Armenian-American figure in American motorsports history. He was a promoter and race car owner.

Early life 
Agajanian was born in San Pedro, Los Angeles, California, just six months after his father had immigrated to the United States, with his entire family, including some cousins, out of war-torn Armenia. He grew up a hard-working young man in the family's refuse collection and hog ranching businesses, which Aggie would later oversee.

At 18, Agajanian had saved enough money to buy a race car. When he told his father that he was going to become a race car driver, the elder Agajanian's reaction was not what young Aggie had hoped. Looking at the car in the garage, his father said to J.C., "So, you are going to be a race driver, that's fine. Just a few things I want you to do first. Go kiss your mother goodbye, pack your bags since you won't be living here anymore and while you're at it, change your name."

Promoting and racing life 
The racing game was brutal in the 1930s. Drivers were dying almost every other week on the dirt ovals of Southern California and Agajanian's father understandably did not want his son to become another statistic. A compromise was settled upon: J.C. could keep the car, but only in the capacity of an owner. J.C. agreed and at 18 became perhaps one of the youngest car owners in automobile racing.

While Agajanian never achieved his childhood dream of becoming a race driver, he did almost everything else, from promoting races to building cars and discovering drivers.

While promoting a race under the blazing desert sun in Arizona, Agajanian purchased a Stetson cowboy hat to protect his head, and thereafter he was rarely seen without one.  His trademarks were his Stetson hat and high-heeled boots made especially for him in Spain.

He was the Armenian heir to a fortune built on pig farming and garbage collection. J.C. was partial to the number "98" and used the number on his Indianapolis, Sprint and Midget cars, a tradition which has continued for generations in the family, including four Indianapolis 500 wins, including the ownership by J.C. in 1952 with driver Troy Ruttman and 1963 with driver Parnelli Jones and co-ownership by son Cary and business partner Mike Curb with Bryan Herta Autosports in 2011 with driver Dan Wheldon and 2016 with driver Alexander Rossi.

He was instrumental in the development of the air jack for faster tire changes at Indianapolis and in the 1930s was president of the Western Racing Association.

His race organizer expertise spanned the country and he became the first race organizer to present 250 United States Automobile Club events, ranging from Midget races like the traditional Turkey Night Grand Prix at various Southern California race tracks, still promoted by the family to this day, to numerous Championship Dirt Car races at state fairground tracks.

From 1948 through 1971, his cars won three pole positions – the first with Walt Faulkner in 1950 – for the Indianapolis 500, set four track records and won the race twice. Troy Ruttman (1952) and Parnelli Jones (1963) both won the 500 in Agajanian machines.

Agajanian also gained fame for a moment of quick thinking that may have saved victory for Parnelli Jones at Indianapolis in 1963. With the race in its waning stages and Scotsman Jim Clark closing on Jones, it became apparent that the Agajanian Willard Battery Special had developed a serious oil leak (something that USAC starter Harlan Fengler had specifically warned teams about in pre-race meetings). When Eddie Sachs crashed – allegedly in oil laid down by Jones' number 98 – Agajanian rushed up to the starter and argued that the leak was stopped, because it had dropped below the level of the crack. By this time, Lotus team owner Colin Chapman had joined the confrontation, demanding that Fengler back up his threat to disqualify cars leaking oil. By the time Jones came around again, the argument was settled. Agajanian's car stayed in the lead, and held it to the end. Chapman and the Lotus engine builder Ford were furious over the result which remains controversial to this day, although they declined to protest as Jones' car (nicknamed "Calhoun") had been the fastest in the race. Many experts believe that USAC officials were biased against Clark and the rear engine Lotus, and that had it been an American driving a roadster in second place at the time Jones would have been black flagged.

He died on May 5, 1984 in Gardena, California. He is buried at Rose Hills Memorial Park in Whittier, California.

Family and legacy

When he died, J.C. left behind his wife, Hazel Faye Agajanian, their four children, Joan Agajanian Quinn(John J), JC Agajanian Jr.(Franci), Cary Agajanian (Judy), Christopher James Agajanian (Laura), 11 grandchildren, his youngest sister Jacqueline Agajanian Cardelucci, and his NFL star brother Ben Agajanian.

J.C.'s daughter, recipient of the 2017 Ellis Island Medal of Honor, and NGO representative for the United Nations, Joan Agajanian Quinn, is a Curator, Producer, and Journalist (for many publications including former West Coast editor for Andy Warhol's Interview magazine, Society editor for Hearst's Herald Examiner). As an Arts Advocate  she was a 17 year board member on the California Arts Council & both the Beverly Hills Arts & Architectural Commissions, among others. Quinn currently Hosts Beverly Hills View & J oan Quinn Profiles TV shows.

Ben Agajanian, J.C's brother died in 2018 at age 98. Cary Agajanan is an attorney and partner at Agajanian, McFall, Weiss, Tetreault, & Crist LLP in the Los Angeles area who is also a co-owner of the motorsport operations of J.C.'s team, now known as Curb-Agajanian Performance Group with legendary musician and fellow Californian Mike Curb. The CAPG won the Indianapolis 500 as co-entrants, in 2011 and 2016 with Bryan Herta Autosport. He notes on the law firm's Web site, '"As legal counsel for the Long Beach Grand Prix and Toyota, U.S.A. in the precedent setting case of Regazzoni vs. Long Beach Grand Prix, Cary convinced the Federal District Court to dismiss all claims asserted by the famed Formula One driver who was paralyzed during practice at the event based upon the waiver and release and express assumption of the risk agreement signed by the driver prior to participation. The Ninth Circuit Court of Appeals later upheld the case, and the well-publicized ruling marked a significant victory for the sports and leisure fields, setting the tone for future similar litigation."'"I didn't even know my dad was bald until I was a teenager,"'' joked his son, Cary. "He even wore the hat sitting down for breakfast in the morning. My mother was always getting on him about that.". J.C. Agajanian Jr., is an actor and comedian who shares his primary interests in motorsports with his father and brother, hosting the USAC Turkey Night Grand Prix on a number of occasions.

Notable drivers for JC Agajanian included Al Unser, Bill Vukovich II, Walt Faulkner, Troy Ruttman and Parnelli Jones.

Awards
Inducted in the International Motorsports Hall of Fame in 2009
 Inducted into the National Sprint Car Hall of Fame in the first class in 1990.
 Inducted into the Motorsports Hall of Fame of America in 1992 for his contributions to motorsports.
 Inducted into the AMA Motorcycle Hall of Fame in 1999.
 Inducted into the West Coast Stock Car Hall of Fame in its first class in 2002.
 Inducted into the National Midget Auto Racing Hall of Fame.
Inducted into the Indianapolis Motor Speedway Hall of Fame in 1990.

Family
J.C.'s younger brother Ben Agajanian was a football placekicker for the 1956 World Champion New York Giants and the 1961 World Champion Green Bay Packers. J.C.'s nephew Dennis Agajanian is a musician.

See also
 History of the Armenian Americans in Los Angeles

References

1913 births
1984 deaths
Sportspeople from Los Angeles
American people of Armenian descent
Auto racing executives
American motorsport people
National Sprint Car Hall of Fame inductees
People from San Pedro, Los Angeles
IndyCar Series team owners